{{DISPLAYTITLE:Omicron1 Canis Majoris}}

Omicron1 Canis Majoris (ο1 CMa, ο1 Canis Majoris) is a red supergiant star in the constellation Canis Major.  It is also a variable star.

Name
Johann Bayer gave two adjacent stars the Bayer designation of ο Canis Majoris in 1603, but without distinguishing between the stars. John Flamsteed gave the two omicron stars his own numbered designations of 16 and 24 Canis Majoris in the early 18th century.  Friedrich Wilhelm Argelander labelled the stars as ο1 and ο2 in his atlas Uranometria Nova.  Nicolas Louis de Lacaille labelled it c Canis Majoris, but this was not upheld by subsequent cartographers. Its Henry Draper Catalogue designation is HD 50877. The two Omicron stars marked the centre of the Great Dog's body on Bayer's 1603 Uranometria.

Distance

The distance to ο1 Canis Majoris is uncertain.  It is strongly associated with the Collinder 121 stellar association, located around 3,500 light years (1,085 parsecs) distant.  Its original Hipparcos parallax placed it at 610 pc, similar to the distance of EZ Canis Majoris, another member of Cr 121.  ο1 CMa appears to be interacting with the nebula around EZ CMa, implying the two are at the same distance.  However, the revised Hipparcos parallax is only 0.22 mas, with a margin of error of 0.43 mas, so the distance is not well-defined but likely to be large.  The distance to EZ CMa is now thought to be around 1,500 pc.  Conversely, though only separated by 2 degrees from the blue supergiant ο2 Canis Majoris, the two appear to be unrelated.

Description

The star itself is an orange K-type supergiant of spectral type K2.5 Iab and is an irregular variable star, varying between apparent magnitudes 3.78 and 3.99. A cool star, its surface temperature is around 3,900 K. Around 8 times as massive as the Sun with around 280 times its diameter, it shines with 16,000 times its luminosity. Interstellar dust only obscures it slightly, and its apparent magnitude is 0.16 fainter than it would be if unobscured. Thought to be around 18 million years old, ο1 Canis Majoris is undergoing nuclear fusion of helium in its core to generate energy and will one day explode as a type II supernova.

References

Canis Majoris, Omicron1
Canis Major
Slow irregular variables
K-type supergiants
Canis Majoris, 16
2580
050877
Durchmusterung objects
033152